Château de Lobit is a château in Landes, Nouvelle-Aquitaine, France. It dates to the 18th century.

Houses completed in the 18th century
Châteaux in Landes (department)
18th-century architecture in France